A shieling is a hut or collection of huts on a seasonal pasture high in the hills, once common in wild or sparsely populated places in Scotland. Usually rectangular with a doorway on the south side and few or no windows, they were often constructed of dry stone or turf. More loosely, the term may denote a seasonal mountain pasture for the grazing of cattle in summer. Seasonal pasturage implies transhumance between the shieling and a valley settlement in winter. Many Scottish songs have been written about life in shielings, often concerning courtship and love. The ruins of shielings are abundant landscape features across Scotland, particularly the Highlands.

Etymology 
A "shieling" is a summer dwelling on a seasonal pasture high in the hills. The first recorded use of the term is from 1568. The word "shieling" comes from "shiel", from the forms schele or shale in the Northern dialect of Middle English, likely related to Old Frisian skul meaning "hiding place" and to Old Norse Skjol meaning "shelter" and Skali meaning "hut".

Seasonal dwelling

Construction 

A shieling, whether an isolated dwelling or in a group, is a hut or small dwelling, usually in an upland area. Shielings were often constructed of locally available dry stone, or turf. The rectangular buildings usually had gabled roofs covered in local materials such as turf, heather, or rushes, supported on timbers. The doorway was usually in the middle of one of the long sides of the building, often on the south side; it was often just a gap in the wall, although some shielings had door jambs and lintels made of larger blocks of stone. The smaller shielings consisted of a single room; most were divided into two or three rooms. There were few or no windows. Some sources consider shielings to differ from farmsteads in lacking an enclosure, although they may be surrounded by a bank and ditch, or by a dry stone wall.

The Welsh traveller and naturalist Thomas Pennant wrote the first description of Scottish shielings:

Usage 

The shieling system was widespread across Europe, including upland Britain and Iceland. It survives into the 21st century in Norway, Northern Sweden and the higher areas of central Europe. Farmers and their families lived in shielings during the summer to enable their livestock to graze common land. Shielings were therefore associated with the transhumance system of agriculture. They were often beside streams, which were used as pathways into the hills, or at the far end of the upland grazing land from the migrants' winter dwellings. The mountain huts generally fell out of use by the end of the 17th century, although in remote areas, such as the Isle of Lewis in the Hebrides, this system continued into the 18th century or even later.

Ruins of shielings are abundant in high or marginal land in Scotland and Northern England, as are place-names containing "shield" or their Gaelic equivalents, such as Pollokshields in Glasgow, Arinagour on the island of Coll, Galashiels in the Scottish Borders, and "Shiels Brae" near Bewcastle. Turf-built shielings have typically gradually eroded and disappeared, but traces of stone-built structures persist in the landscape. Some shielings are medieval in origin and were occasionally occupied permanently after the abandonment of the transhumance system. The construction of associated structures such as stack-stands and enclosures indicate that in these cases they became farmsteads, some of which evolved into contemporary farms.

Scottish shieling songs 
Many Scottish songs have been written about life in shielings, often concerning courtship and love. Several of these are in Alexander Macdonald's 1914 Story and Song from Loch Ness-side, including "Cha teid mi Choir Odhar", "Chunacas gruagach ‘s an aonach", and "A fhlesgaich is cummaire", all from Perthshire, and "Luinneag Airidh" (a shieling lovesong). The song "Chunacas gruagach ‘s an aonach" includes the lines
"Many times often you and I,
Have been at the shieling  on Brae Rannoch.
On the hillock of the waterfall,
Where we were resting.
In the bothy of the dalliance,
With a brushwood screen for door.
My mouth placed on your fragrant mouth,
And my hand would be round you, my love."

The song is similar to the famous "Bothan Àirigh am Bràigh Raithneach" (The Shieling bothy on Brae Rannoch). Shielings are mentioned in the folk song "Mairi's Wedding", in the weaver poet Robert Tannahill's song "Gilly Callum", and in the musicologist William Sharp's "Shieling Song" of 1896, and in the title of Marjory Kennedy-Fraser's tune "Island Sheiling Song". Edward Thomas wrote a poem called "The Shieling". The Scottish poet Robert Burns mentions a "shiel" in his song "Bessy and her Spinnin' Wheel" and his poem "The Country Lass".

See also 
 Scottish vernacular architecture
 History of agriculture in Wales
 Croft
 Knocking stone
 Scottish Vernacular

Notes

References

Bibliography

External links 
 The Shielings in Scotland: The origins of the Shielings and their function
 The Mountain Bothies Association

Stone houses
Buildings and structures in Scotland
Huts
House types in the United Kingdom
Agricultural buildings
Scottish traditions
Transhumance
Pastoral shelters